Ken Allen (February 13, 1971 – December 1, 2000) was a Bornean orangutan at the San Diego Zoo. He became one of the most popular animals in the history of the zoo because of his many successful escapes from his enclosures. He was nicknamed "the Hairy Houdini".

Ken Allen was born in captivity at the San Diego Zoo in 1971. In 1985, he gained worldwide attention for a series of three escapes from his enclosure, which had been thought to be escape-proof. During some of his escapes, his female companions joined him. Ken Allen's ability to outwit his keepers, as well as his docile demeanor during his escapes, resulted in fame. He had his own fan club, and was the subject of T-shirts and bumper stickers (most reading "Free Ken Allen"). A song, "The Ballad of Ken Allen", was written about him.

Ken Allen developed prostate cancer and was euthanized on December 1, 2000. He was 29 years old.

Escapes
In 1985, during his three escapes on June 13, July 29, and August 13, Ken Allen peacefully strolled around the zoo looking at other animals. Ken never acted violently or aggressively towards zoo patrons or animals. 

Zookeepers were initially stumped over how he had managed to escape. Zoo staff began surveillance of his enclosure to try to catch him in the act, only to find that he seemed to be aware that he was being watched. This forced zookeepers to go "undercover", posing as tourists to learn Ken Allen's escape route, but the ape was not fooled. Moreover, other orangutans began following Ken Allen's lead, escaping from their enclosure. Zoo officials eventually hired experienced rock climbers to find every finger-, toe- and foothold within the enclosure, spending $40,000 to eliminate the identified holds.

Time in 2011 listed Ken Allen's story as one of the Top Eleven Zoo Escapes.

See also
 List of individual apes

References

Further reading

1971 animal births
2000 animal deaths
Individual primates in the United States
Individual orangutans
Missing or escaped animals
San Diego Zoo